Il-Alti or Il-Altun was a daughter of Genghis Khan by an unknown concubine of lowly status. Her name was improperly transcribed as Alaltun during the translation of Altan Tobchi from Uighur Mongol script to Cyrillic Mongol script, when indeed her name was Il-Alti or Il-Altun. Historians often mistake Il-Alti for Altalun, the youngest daughter of Borte Ujin.

Family
The children of Börte were given more power than those of the other wives of Genghis Khan. However, Il-Alti was born to a concubine, whose name was not recorded in the history of the Mongols. She had nine half-brothers and five half-sisters. Four of her nine half-brothers died before reaching adulthood. The remaining five were Jochi, Chagatay, Ogotei, Tolui and Kholgen. Her half sisters were: Koa Ujin Bekhi, Checheikhen, Alakhai Bekhi, Tumelun, and Altalun. Historians have been mistaking Il-Alti for Altalun for many years.

Betrothal and Death 
Genghis Khan promised Il-Alti to the Uighur chieftain Barjuk Idi-Qut for his submission, services and loyalty to the Mongol Empire. However, because Idi-Qut already had a principal wife whom he honored, Barjuk and Il-Alti's wedding was postponed. It was further delayed by Genghis Khan's death. Two years after Genghis Khan died, Ogotei ascended to the throne and became the Khan of the Mongol Empire. To fulfill his father's promise Ogotei was to give Il-Alti to Barjuk, however, Il-Alti died before Barjuk arrived at the Khan's court. 

In place of Il-Alti, Alaji Bekhi (possibly a daughter of Ogotei) was given to Barjuk. But, Barjuk died before Alaji Bekhi could arrive to Besh-Baligh. Following Barjuk's death, his son Kesmes traveled to Ogotei Khan's court to ask for Alaji Bekhi's hand. The Khan agreed, however, Kesmes also died before the nuptial. In the end, during Toregene Khatun's rule, Alaji Bekhi married Salindi Idi-Qut, a younger son of Barjuk Idi-Qut and brother of Kesmes. Salindi Idi-Qut was punished and executed during Mongke Khan's reign for supporting Toregene Khatun and Ogotei's descendants. 

According to The Secret History of the Mongol Queens by Jack Weatherford, Il-Alti was the ruler of the Uighurs and a heroine in the history of the Mongol Empire. According to Persian chronicler Rashid al-Din, she was Genghis Khan's favorite daughter, but someone from Ögedei's faction executed her shortly after Ögedei's death, supposedly because Il-Alti had poisoned Ögedei. However, Kublai Khan was not convinced that Il-Alti was guilty, and at a trial of several of Ögedei's retainers, demanded to know why Il-Alti was killed without a trial, in violation of Genghis Khan's laws.

Source

Women of the Mongol Empire
Genghis Khan
13th-century Mongolian women
12th-century Mongolian women
13th-century deaths
Year of birth unknown